Iška Loka is a village in the Municipality of Ig in central Slovenia, in the marshes just south of the capital Ljubljana. The entire municipality is part of the traditional region of Inner Carniola and is now included in the Central Slovenia Statistical Region.

Surface finds of pottery and worked stone tools in the area point to Mesolithic, Chalcolithic, and Early Bronze Age settlement of the area.

At the southern edge of the settlement, at the intersection of roads leading to Ig and Staje, there is a chapel-shrine with an image in relief. It dates from the 19th century.

References

External links
Iška Loka on Geopedia

Populated places in the Municipality of Ig